Abraham Dowdney (October 31, 1841 – December 10, 1886) was a United States Representative from New York, as well as an officer in the Union Army during the American Civil War.

Biography
Born in Youghal, County Cork, Ireland, he emigrated to the United States with his parents, who settled in New York City. He attended private schools, engaged in the building and contracting business.

Civil War 
served in the Civil War as a captain in the 132nd New York Volunteer Infantry Regiment in 1862 and 1863. His regiment served primarily in Virginia and North Carolina with the XVIII Corps.

Dowdney was chairman of the public school trustees of New York City from 1882 to 1885.

Congress 
He was elected as a Democrat to the 49th Congress and served from March 4, 1885 until his death in New York City in 1886 at the age of 45.

Interment was in Calvary Cemetery, Long Island City.

See also
List of United States Congress members who died in office (1790–1899)

References

 Retrieved on 2008-02-14

External links
 
Abraham Dowdney entry at The Political Graveyard

 

1841 births
1886 deaths
Burials at Calvary Cemetery (Queens)
Irish emigrants to the United States (before 1923)
Politicians from County Cork
Politicians from New York City
People of New York (state) in the American Civil War
Union Army officers
Irish soldiers in the United States Army
Democratic Party members of the United States House of Representatives from New York (state)
19th-century American politicians
People from Youghal